The Corner Bar is an American sitcom that aired on ABC from June 1972 to September 1973.

The Corner Bar revolves around the lives of the patrons of a tavern called Grant's Toomb. The series is notable for its inclusion of the first recurring gay character on American television, Peter Panama (played by Vincent Schiavelli).

Cast
 Gabriel Dell . . . Harry Grant (Season 1)
 J. J. Barry . . . Fred Costello
 Bill Fiore . . . Phil Bracken
 Shimen Ruskin . . . Meyer Shapiro
 Joe Keys . . . Joe (Season 1)
 Vincent Schiavelli . . . Peter Panama (Season 1)
 Langhorn Scrubbs . . . Mary Ann (Season 1)
 Anne Meara . . . Mae (Season 2)
 Eugene Roche . . . Frank Flynn (Season 2)
 Ron Carey . . . Donald Hooten (Season 2)

Guest stars
 Huntz Hall (Episode "The Navy Reunion")

Episodes

Season 1: 1972

Season 2: 1973

References

External links

 

1972 American television series debuts
1973 American television series endings
1970s American sitcoms
American Broadcasting Company original programming
1970s American LGBT-related television series
Television shows set in New York City
English-language television shows
American LGBT-related sitcoms